Lesmesodon ("tooth from Messel") is an extinct genus of proviverid hyaenodont that lived during the Early to Middle Eocene. It was found in France and in the Messel Pit in Germany. Lesmesodon was a weasel-sized carnivorous mammal.

Phylogeny 
The phylogenetic relationships of genus Lesmesodon are shown in the following cladogram.

See also 
 Mammal classification
 Proviverridae

References 

Hyaenodonts
Eocene mammals
Eocene mammals of Europe
Prehistoric placental genera